The South Australian Railways 400 class was a class of 4-8-2+2-8-4 articulated steam locomotives built in France in 1952 and 1953 under licence to Beyer, Peacock & Co. Ltd, Manchester, UK. The locomotives mainly hauled ore on the  narrow gauge  line from the SA/NSW border to smelters at Port Pirie until 1963, when they were replaced by diesel locomotives. They also operated on the lines to Terowie and Quorn. Subsequently some were stored at  before being scrapped.

Two have been preserved, in static condition:
No. 402 at the Zig Zag Railway, Lithgow
No. 409 at the National Railway Museum, Port Adelaide.

Gallery

Notes

References

Select bibliography

External links

Locomotive Specifications at SteamLocomotive.com

Franco-Belge locomotives
Beyer, Peacock locomotives
4-8-2+2-8-4 locomotives
Garratt locomotives
400
Railway locomotives introduced in 1953
3 ft 6 in gauge locomotives of Australia

Freight locomotives